Megasurcula elongata is an extinct species of sea snail, a marine gastropod mollusk in the family Pseudomelatomidae, the turrids and allies.

Distribution
Fossils of this marine species have been found in Miocene strata in Japan.

References

Hatai, K. 1940. A Note on Two Miocene Gastropods. Bull. Biogeogr. Soc. of Japan, vol 10, no 8, pp. 115–117.
Hatai, K. 1941. Additional Fossils from Certain Miocene Formations. Bull. Biogeogr. Soc. of Japan, vol. 11, no. 13, pp. 105–112. pl 3.

elongata
Gastropods described in 1940